Schillaci may refer to:

People
 Giovanni Schillaci (born 1967), Italian wrestler 
 Jenna Schillaci (born 1984), English football defender 
 Jon Schillaci (born 1971), American sex offender
 Orazio Schillaci (born 1966), Italian politician
 Riley Schillaci (born 1982), American sword swallower
 Salvatore Schillaci (born 1964), Italian football striker

Horse racing
 Schillaci (horse) (1988–2001), Australian Thoroughbred racehorse
 Schillaci Stakes, Australian thoroughbred horse race

Italian-language surnames